Jaguar is a 1994 Greek drama film directed by Katerina Evangelakou. It was entered into the 19th Moscow International Film Festival.

Cast
 Nini Vosniakou as Dimitra
 Ivonni Maltezou as Filio Kallimanopoulou
 Dimitris Katalifos as Ilias
 Akilas Karazisis as Andreas Kallimanopoulos
 Taxiarhis Hanos as Kostas

References

External links
 

1994 films
1994 drama films
Greek drama films
1990s Greek-language films